The Liberator (1831–1865) was a weekly abolitionist newspaper, printed and published in Boston by William Lloyd Garrison and, through 1839, by Isaac Knapp. Religious rather than political, it appealed to the moral conscience of its readers, urging them to demand immediate freeing of the slaves ("immediatism"). It also promoted women's rights, an issue that split the American abolitionist movement. Despite its modest circulation of 3,000, it had prominent and influential readers, including  Frederick Douglass, Beriah Green and Alfred Niger. It frequently printed or reprinted letters, reports, sermons, and news stories relating to American slavery, becoming a sort of community bulletin board for the new abolitionist movement that Garrison helped foster.

History 

Garrison co-published weekly issues of The Liberator from Boston continuously for 35 years, from January 1, 1831, to the final issue of December 29, 1865. Although its  circulation was only about 3,000, and three-quarters of subscribers (in 1834) were African Americans, the newspaper earned nationwide notoriety for its uncompromising advocacy of "immediate and complete emancipation of all slaves" in the United States. Garrison set the tone for the paper in his famous open letter "To the Public" in the first issue:

 Rather than looking to politics to create change, Garrison utilized nonviolent means, such as moral suasion, as his message throughout the newspaper. Garrison felt that slavery was a moral issue and used his way of writing to appeal to the morality of his readers as an attempt to influence them into changing their morally questionable ways. For example, "No Union with Slave-Holders" was a slogan utilized for weeks at a time throughout the newspaper's publication, advocating that the North should leave the Union.

The Liberator continued for three decades from its founding through the end of the American Civil War. It had black columnists and reporters. Garrison ended the newspaper's run with a valedictory column at the end of 1865, when the ratification of the Thirteenth Amendment abolished slavery throughout the United States. It was succeeded by The Nation.

Women's rights advocacy
The Liberator also became an avowed women's rights newspaper when the prospectus for its 1838 issue declared that as the paper's objective was "to redeem woman as well as man from a servile to an equal condition," it would support "the rights of woman to their utmost extent." In January and February 1838, the Liberator published Sarah Grimké's "Letters on the Province of Woman", and later that year published them as a book, to another of Garrison and Knapp's projects Boston Female Anti-Slavery Society. During the following decades, the Liberator promoted women's rights by publishing editorials, petitions, convention calls and proceedings, speeches, legislative action, and other material advocating women's suffrage, equal property rights, and women's educational and professional equality. The Liberators printers, Isaac Knapp, James Brown Yerrinton (1800–1866) and James Manning Winchell Yerrinton (1825–1893), and Robert Folger Wallcut (1797–1884), printed many of the women's rights tracts of the 1850s.

Inspiration among abolitionists 

The Liberator  inspired abolitionist Angelina Grimké to publicly join the abolitionist movement. She sent a letter to William Lloyd Garrison recalling her experiences as a member of an upper class, white, slaveholding family. Angelina Grimké's letter to William Lloyd Garrison was soon after published in The Liberator.

Frederick Douglass was at first inspired by The Liberator. As he commented upon in his first issue of The North Star, Douglass felt that it was necessary for African-Americans, such as himself, to speak out about their own experiences with injustice. He claimed that those that experienced injustice were the ones that must demand justice. Soon after, Douglass began writing his own abolitionist newspaper, The North Star. By 1851 Douglass broke bitterly with Garrison and now worked for abolition and equality through the U.S. Constitution and political system.

in 1836, five years after he agreed to be The Liberator's agent in Rhode Island, Alfred Niger helped to found the Rhode Island Anti-Slavery Society, one of only two Black men in the entire organization.

Resistance 
The Liberator faced harsh resistance from several state legislatures and local groups: for example, North Carolina indicted Garrison for felonious acts, and the Vigilance Association of Columbia, South Carolina, offered a reward of $1,500 to those who identified distributors of the paper.

Garrison also faced resistance, even to the point of violence.  In 1835, a Boston mob formed with support from local newspapers in resistance to the announcement that George Thompson would speak at the first anniversary meeting of the Boston Female Anti-Slavery Society.  The mob, unable to find Thompson, redirected their aggression towards Garrison who was in the society's meeting hall. Eventually escalation of the situation led to destruction of the society's antislavery sign, and even calls to lynch Garrison, around whose neck a piece of rope made into a noose was put. Garrison eventually managed a narrow escape; the mayor put him in the city jail for his protection.

Contents online
 The Liberator full online archives at Fair Use Repository, including archives of full-page scans of all issues from 1831–1865 (Vols. I–XXXV).
 The Liberator Complete Archives at the Digital Commonwealth of Massachusetts. Original copy owned by Garrison and served as the copy of reference at The Liberator offices.
 The Liberator Files searchable (basic search only) collection maintained by Horace Seldon, which says on its home page that it contains "only a tiny portion of what appeared in the 1,803 editions of the paper".

Garrison's articles
Garrison wrote much of the content. He wrote while typesetting; that is to say, most was not written out on paper first. The following are examples of articles and editorials written by him:
 To the Public, Garrison's introductory column, January 1, 1831.
 Truisms, January 8, 1831.
 Walker's Appeal, January 8, 1831.
 The Insurrection, Garrison's reaction to the news of Nat Turner's slave rebellion in Virginia, September 3, 1831.
 The Great Crisis!, December 29, 1832, one of Garrison's first explicit condemnations of the Constitution and the Union.
 Declaration of Sentiments, adopted by the Boston Peace Convention September 18, 1838, reprinted in The Liberator, September 28, 1838.
 Abolition at the Ballot Box, June 28, 1839.
 The American Union, January 10, 1845.
 American Colorphobia, June 11, 1847.
 On the Dissolution of the Union, June 15, 1855.
 The Tragedy at Harper's Ferry, Garrison's first public comments on John Brown's raid on Harpers Ferry, October 28, 1859.
 John Brown and the Principle of Nonresistance, a speech given at a meeting in the Tremont Temple, Boston, on December 2, 1859, the day that John Brown was hanged, printed December 16, 1859.
 The War – Its Cause and Cure, May 3, 1861.
 Valedictory: The Final Number of The Liberator, Garrison's closing column, December 29, 1865.

See also
 Abolitionist publications
 North Star, an anti-slavery newspaper owned and run by Frederick Douglass.
 Women's suffrage publications
 List of newspapers in Massachusetts

References

Bibliography

 Fanuzzi, Robert A. " 'The Organ of an Individual': William Lloyd Garrison and the Liberator." Prospects 23 (1998): 107-127.
 Jacobs, Donald M. "William Lloyd Garrison's Liberator and Boston's Blacks, 1830-1865." New England Quarterly (1971): 259-277. online
 Nord, David Paul. "Tocqueville, Garrison and the perfection of journalism." Journalism History 13.2 (1986): 56-63. online
 Rohrbach, Augusta. " 'Truth Stranger and Stronger than Fiction': Reexamining William Lloyd Garrison’s The Liberator." in Truth Stranger Than Fiction: Race, Realism, and the US Literary Market Place (Palgrave Macmillan US, 2002) pp. 1-27.
 

 Thomas, John L. The Liberator: William Lloyd Garrison (1963), a scholarly biography online

 Williams, Cecil B. "Whittier's Relation to Garrison and the 'Liberator'." New England Quarterly (1952): 248-255. online

Primary sources
 Cain, William E. ed. William Lloyd Garrison and the Fight Against Slavery: Selections from The Liberator (Bedford Books of St. Martin’s Press, 1992)

 Garrison, William Lloyd. Documents of Upheaval: Selections from William Lloyd Garrison's The Liberator, 1831-1965 (Hill and Wang, 1966).

External links

  non-searchable PDFs of every issue.
 
 
   (searchable; subscription required)

External links
 The story of The Liberator is retold in the radio drama "The Liberators (Part I)", a presentation from Destination Freedom

African-American newspapers
Abolitionist newspapers published in the United States
Defunct newspapers published in Massachusetts
Newspapers published in Boston
19th century in Boston
African-American history in Boston
United States documents
Publications established in 1831
Publications disestablished in 1866
1831 establishments in Massachusetts
1866 disestablishments in Massachusetts
William Lloyd Garrison